Rahul Kumar may refer to:

 Rahul Kumar (politician) (born 1984), Indian politician
 Rahul Kumar (footballer) (born 1985), Indian footballer
 Rahul Kumar (actor) (born 1995), Indian actor
 Rahul Kumar (cricketer) (born 2003), Indian cricketer